Colegio San Agustín – Makati, also referred to by its acronym CSA or CSA-Makati, is a private, Catholic, co-educational basic education institution run by the Augustinian Province of the Most Holy Name of Jesus of the Philippines of the Order of Saint Augustine in Dasmariñas Village, Makati, Metro Manila, Philippines. It was founded by the Augustinians in 1969.

The school is one of the most diverse in the Philippines in terms of nationality, with 11% of the student population coming from over 40 countries. Like its sister schools (Colegio San Agustin-Bacolod, Colegio San Agustin-Biñan and Colegio San Agustin-Bulacan), the students of CSA-Makati are called "Augustinians" (Filipino: Agustino).

History

In 1967 the Augustinians, with the approval of the Fr. Santos Abia y Polvorosa, the Augustinian Regional Superior, purchased from Ayala y Cía eight hectares of land in Dasmariñas Village, Makati, with an option to buy four (4) more adjacent hectares within ten years. On November 24, 1976, nine years later, they received as donation from Ayala y Cía, two of the four hectares stipulated in the option agreement. In turn, they released the last two hectares of land to Ayala y Cía, for the latter to sell to other parties. By then, Colegio San Agustín already owned ten hectares: eight through purchase and two through donation.

To organize a new corporation, the Augustinians used an existing organization, Colegio San Agustín (Bacolod), Inc. to acquire the land, agree to the option and make initial payments. Fr. Ambrosio Galindez of Colegio San Agustín (Bacolod), Inc. and Mr. Miguel Ortigas of Makati Development Corporation (now part of Ayala Corporation) signed the agreements in January 1967. The agreements stipulated that within six months the purchaser had to submit a development plan to the owner that would include the setting up of elementary, high school and college facilities within the area, upon which detailed plans for the buildings to be constructed would be based.

When the new corporation emerged, the president, Fr. Ambrosio Galindez, transferred the rights from Colegio San Agustín (Bacolod) to San Agustín College (Makati), Inc. on 25 April 1967.

Auxiliary Bishop Bienvenido Lopez, D.D., blessed the cornerstone of the first CSA building on 1 September 1968. Ten months later, on 7 July 1969, the school opened its doors to the first enrollees, both male and female, numbering 652. On 28 August 1969, Cardinal Rufino Santos blessed the first buildings constructed by architect Manuel T. Mañosa Jr.: the administration building, which served as the priests' residence, and the grade school building, phase 1, which temporarily housed kindergarten, preparatory, elementary and high school levels. At the start, only two priests, Frs. Ángel Rodríguez and Horacio Rodríguez, ran the school with the help of twenty-four lady teachers. The levels offered then were kindergarten, preparatory, grades one to six, first and second year high school. The addition of grade seven, third and fourth year high school came in subsequent years. Today, there are six Augustinian priests and nearly four hundred employees in CSA. Classes from nursery to preparatory, grades one to twelve (implementation of the K-12 program), serving a student body of more than 6,100.

School enrollment increased significantly, requiring rapid physical expansion in the early years: the bull-ring-shaped kindergarten building in 1972; the ultra-modern CSA chapel, phase 1 of the covered basketball courts, the grade school canteen and phase 2 of the grade school building in 1973, and the sports complex in 1974.

Given the need for expansion, CSA embarked on expansion projects under Architect Jose O. Dizon: the high school building in 1977, the theatre in 1980, the high school annex in 1985, and the grade school southeast wing in 1986.

In 1992 the administration pushed for the construction of the polysport and the cafetorium. In 1995 the school equipped itself to handle computer systems.

Air-conditioning of classrooms at all levels was implemented in 2002, the year the streetlight project was completed and the vertical extension of the grade school covered walk fence added.

In 2004 architect Ireneo Jasareno conducted a major renovation of the CSA theatre, which was inaugurated on 25 November 2005, and of the Sta. Rita de Cascia Hall (grade school lecture room), which was blessed on 30 June 2006. He also was responsible for the technical supervision of the construction of La Pergola de Maria, Mary's grotto, on 17 January 2008.

As the student population continued to grow, further expansion was needed, starting with the completion of the High School Building in 1977.  Other expansions and additions include those of the theatre in 1980, the High School Annex and Phase II of the covered courts in 1985, the grade school building's southeast wing in 1986, the Polysport complex, cafeteria and lounging shed (now St. Monica Hall) in 1987, the renovated administration building (since renamed Urdaneta Hall) and pre-school buildings in 1992, the renovation of the high school science laboratories in 1997, and the grade school annex in 1998. Air conditioning was introduced in the 1990s for administrative offices and function rooms and in 2003 for classrooms in all departments. The theatre was demolished and rebuilt in 2005–2006.  This was followed by the renovation of the grade school chemistry laboratory in 2006 and early 2007. The gymnasium was inaugurated and blessed on July 7, 2010, and named Sto. Tomas of Villanueva.

Student possession of mobile phones was banned since the late 1990s but was later relaxed for high school students.

On December 3, 2018 it was formally announced that Dante M.  Bendoy, would be the rector from 2018 to 2022

On July 7, 2019, the school celebrated its 50th anniversary with a Eucharistic celebration conducted by Cardinal Tagle and concelebrated by invited Augustinian priests.

Fighting incident 
On December 5, 2022 at approximately 9:15 AM, there was a fighting incident between 2 students in the Grade 9 Bathroom, one of them had brought brass knuckles. a nearby security guard was requested to aid the students, and were then sent to the school clinic, footage from twitter user @G9CSAracist caused much publicity to the incident.

a statement on the incident was made by the school's Rector the next day, an ongoing investigation was then initiated by the school.

Facilities

Athletic facilities
CSA has three main athletic facilities: the Cassisiacum Sports Complex, the CSA Polysport Complex and the fields.

St. Thomas of Villanova Hall (Sports Complex)

The newly inaugurated and renovated sports complex consists of state-of-the art badminton and tennis courts and multipurpose areas, a main basketball court with NBA and FIBA standards including an electronic scoreboard, hardwood flooring, retractable backboards and wall cushions for players; a second basketball court which has 6 baskets and can double as volleyball courts, a fitness room with ultra modern equipment, a running track oval which is located above the second basketball court, a cafeteria, a mini-Olympic swimming pool, a "kiddie" pool with spa, plus rooms for dance, ballet, taekwondo, flute, guitar, piano, violin, voice and other music lessons. Other areas are being eyed for rock climbing. Under the tennis courts is an underground parking lot. The inauguration took place on July 7, 2010.

CSA Polysport Complex
The CSA Polysport Complex is dominated by the six covered courts, two for each department.  While they primarily serve as basketball courts, they can also be modified to become volleyball courts. Physical education classes are usually held in the covered courts, and there are stages for presentations.  The offices of the Athletics Department are in the Polysport Complex.

Fields
There are two fields in CSA: one for football and one for baseball and softball.  The football field is also used by the Aerospace Cadets of the Philippines. Beside the football field is a grandstand.

Education facilities

CSA has three education buildings: the Pre-School Building, the Grade School Building and the High School Building.  However, there are common facilities to all the buildings: classrooms, libraries, computer laboratories, the Guidance Center and, for the Grade School and High School, the Audio-Visual Room and science laboratories

Classrooms
The typical CSA classroom is air-conditioned, each classroom has a projector and a white pull-out screen, has a blackboard/whiteboard and contains around 20-45 desks, depending on the level. In the High School, there is also a platform for teachers to stand on. There are bulletin boards in classrooms, as well as a clock, a crucifix and pictures of Saint Augustine, Our Lady of Good Counsel and St. Monica. Classrooms in the Preschool and Grade School Departments have cubbyholes for books and lunch boxes. There is also a cleaning closet that can help clean the classroom.

Laboratories
The High School has four science laboratories. There are laboratories for physical science, biology, chemistry and physics.  The Chemistry Laboratory underwent renovation in 2006 and was completed in early 2007.

There are computer laboratories in each department, one in the Pre-School, four in the Grade School and four in the High School.  They are used for general computer classes.  In addition to the computer laboratories in the Grade School, there is a computer-aided instruction room for interactive learning.

Students and teachers can access the Internet in the classroom and faculties.

Libraries
CSA has three libraries, one for each department.  The largest of these libraries is the High School Library, and all are air-conditioned.  All libraries contain reference, Filipiniana, Augustiniana (works by St. Augustine), fiction and non-fiction sections.  In the Grade School and High School, there is a "Teacher's Corner" for the exclusive use of teachers, containing textbooks and textbook manuals, as well as teacher references.  There are also small "computer corners" in each library.

Cafeteria

The Cafeteria or Integrated Canteen is above the covered courts and has 23 stalls offering food and other meals in a fast-food-like fashion.  There are nine entrances to the Cafeteria: two from the High School Building, two from the Grade School Building, three from the covered courts and one for each school bus terminal. It has a seating capacity of 2,186.

Chapel
San Agustin Chapel is where all year-level, organizational and sectoral Masses are heard.  It can handle around 400-500 persons, which is the size of an average year level.  Due to its small size, departmental and institutional Masses are heard at the covered court or, in the case of institutional Masses, the Grade School covered court.

Architectural features of the Chapel include statues of St. Augustine of Hippo and St. Monica of Hippo on both sides of the crucifix behind the altar.

San Agustin Chapel offers weekday morning Masses in English, Sunday Masses in English and Filipino, and a Spanish-language anticipated Mass.

Recently, in around 2012 renovations were made to the chapel, including added glass around the sides, installing air-conditioner units and adding glass doors as the chapel was once open and without doors.

San Agustin Theatre

The San Agustin Theatre, also known as St. Ambrose Hall, was inaugurated in 1980 by Fr. Horacio R. Rodriguez, the former rector.  The Theatre then had a seating capacity of 1,000. By the late 1990s students and staff often complained of the dilapidated interior. Therefore, the theatre was renovated between 2003 and 2005, which increased the seating capacity to 1100. The only remaining original feature of the Theatre is the mosaic in its lobby.
The Theatre is used for school functions, such as academic contests, graduation, recognition ceremonies, songfests, choral recitations, and most notably the annual Lux Nova pageant.  The Theatre is also rented out to private entities.

Urdaneta Hall

Urdaneta Hall, also known as the Administration Building, is the location of all CSA-wide offices. The CSA Accounting and Registrar's Offices are on the ground floor.  There are bathrooms in the Accounting and Registrar's Offices for parents. Other than those offices, Urdaneta Hall is off-limits to students. Beside the Accounting and Registrar's Offices is the Technology Services office.

Student activities

The school has co-curricular clubs for student participation. The school fields varsity teams and official school delegations participate in competitive leagues and contests on the local, national, and international levels.

These clubs organize competitions between individuals, classes, and batches in the High School; teachers assume this responsibility in the Grade School.

Student government
The Unit 2 (Grade School) and Unit 3 (High School) each have student governments: Grade School Student Government (GSSG) and the Supreme Student Council (SSC).  These are elected by popular vote through secret balloting by students from Fourth to Sixth Grade for U2SC, and by students from Grade 7 to Grade 12 for the SSC. In 2010, the GSSC held its first automated elections with the use of a computer instead of a ballot.

The Unit 3 Student Council serves as an umbrella organization for the smaller year level councils (the Grade 7 & 8, Freshman, Sophomore, Junior, and Senior councils).  These are elected the same way as the SSC and U2SC, although with voting restricted to the members of their respective year levels, making these "batch" presidents the Filipino equivalents of American class presidents.

Augustinian community

Dante Morabe Bendoy - Rector; Principal, Grade School
Julian Casanova Mazana - Vice Rector; Director, Sports Department; Director for Finance & Treasurer; Principal, High School
Juanito Balena Caspe - Local Prior and School Chaplain
Francis Andrew Balmaceda - Local Procurator
Gideon Aidan Mgaya -  Director, Administrative & Student Services
Horacio Rodriguez Rodriguez - Rector emeritus, Grade School (former)
William Peter Acaac Arlegui - Community Member

See also
 Augustinian Province of the Most Holy Name of Jesus of the Philippines
 Colegio San Agustin - Biñan
 Colegio San Agustin - Bacolod
 University of San Agustin
 Santo Niño de Cebu

External links
 Colegio San Agustin Makati Alumni Association 
 Colegio San Agustin, Makati
 Augustinian Province of the Most Holy Name of Jesus of the Philippines

Footnotes

Augustinian schools
Educational institutions established in 1968
Catholic elementary schools in Metro Manila
Catholic secondary schools in Metro Manila
Schools in Makati